San Ena Oniro (Greek: Σαν Ένα Όνειρο; English: Like a dream) is the first studio album by Greek Cypriot singer Ivi Adamou, released in Greece and Cyprus on 22 July 2011 by Sony Music Greece. The album was re-released as a "Euro Edition" featuring the three songs that Adamou competed with in the Cypriot national final for the Eurovision Song Contest 2012, as well as a Greek-language version of one of the songs.

Editions 
The album had two editions, the regular and the euro edition released in July 2011 and January 2012 respectively.

Regular edition 
The regular edition was released in Cyprus and Greece on 22 July 2011. It included ten songs with the most being written and produced by Giannis Hristodoulopoulos and Yiannis Doxas. Some of the songs were written in English by foreigner lyricists and were translated to Greek. The album included Adamou's collaboration with Mellises, "Krata Ta Matia Sou Klista".

"Tis Agapis Ta Thimata", was set to be released by Elena Paparizou but was later recorded by Adamou. The song was originally written under the title "Murderous" and was translated for the album. The song "Fige" had an English version named "Madness" which was not included in the album and featured the Greek band tU. The album's title track, "San Ena Oniro", was originally performed by Robert Williams and Bessy Argiraki. Adamou performed her own version of the song with Giorgos Papadimitrakis from the band Kokkina Halia.

Euro edition 
The euro edition was released in Cyprus and Greece on 30 January 2012. It included all the ten tracks from the regular edition with four additional songs including the fifth single, "La La Love", which represented Cyprus in the 2012 Eurovision Song Contest. It also included the other two songs that were candidates to represent the country. The fourth song, "Fotia Vrohi", was the Greek version of "You Don't Belong Here".

Singles
"Krata Ta Matia Sou Klista"
"Kano Mia Efhi"
"Voltes St Asteria"
"La La Love"

Critical response 

Critical reaction to San Ena Oniro was generally mixed. Miss magazine author said "a short dream, like all the good ones, as the 10 tracks remind us of the classic LP of the 80s that they only "hid" inside them ... diamonds!" and gave the album four out of five stars.

Marina Skopelitou of Music Corner gave a mixed review to the album; "a clean pop album, with songs of simple melodies and plain lyrics and strong electronic elements". She also said that all the songs are suitable for her age apart from "Kati Gia Na Piasto" which doesn't suit to a young singer. Skopelitou described the songs as "happy", "lighthearted", "dance" and "loved by young audience" while selecting "Voltes St Asteria" and "San Ena Oniro" as the best songs. For the album's second single, "Voltes St Asteria" said that its lyrics are the most interesting thing on the song as they express most people by talking about love that makes money and material goods unnecessary. At the end, she described the album as "another good try by Adamou who makes her first steps".

Track listing

Personnel

Giannis Doxas – executive producer
Dimitris Stassos – production, arrangement, mixing, background vocals
Giannis Hristodoulopoulos – production, arrangement, guitar, mixing
Vasilis Gavriilidis – production, arrangement, programming, keys
Leonidas Tzitzos – production, arrangement, programming, keys
Nalle Ahlstedt – production, arrangement, programming
Melisses – production, arrangement, mixing
Mikko Tamminen – production, arrangement, mixing
Flawless (Vangelis Kostoxenakis, Evan Klimakis) – production, arrangement
Mihalis "Meth" Kouinelis – production, arrangement
Tasos Hamosfakidis – recording, vocal recording, mixing
Melody Production Group – recording, mixing
Christos Kouligas – guitar
Eyo – mixing
Elena Patroklou – vocal coach
Marianna Gerasimidou – background vocals
Mikaela Stenström – background vocals
Malin Dinah Sundstrom – background vocals
Sibel Redzep – background vocals
Bill Georgoussis – photography
Cult Design – album cover art
Stefanos Vasilakis – hairstyling
Grigoris Pirpilis – make up
Dionisis Kolpodinos – personal stylist
Mirto Gonou – image editing

Charts

Peak positions

Release history

La La Love Tour 

Adamou toured in Europe after the 2012 Eurovision Song Contest and performed her songs including "La La Love" and "Madness".

References 

Sony Music Greece albums
Ivi Adamou albums
Greek-language albums
2011 debut albums